A list of films produced in Italy in 1942 (see 1942 in film):

References

External links
Italian films of 1942 at the Internet Movie Database

Italian
1942
Films